The German-speaking Evangelical Lutheran Church in Namibia (known as GELC, GELK, or DELK) is a Lutheran denomination based in Namibia. It was founded in 1960, and has 4,434 members.

GELC joined the Lutheran World Federation in 1963. It is also a member of the Council of Churches in Namibia.

Along with the Evangelical Lutheran Church in Namibia and the Evangelical Lutheran Church in the Republic of Namibia, GELC formed the United Church Council of the Lutheran Churches in Namibia in 2007. The aim of this body is ultimately to achieve church union.

References

External links
 

1960 establishments in South West Africa
German-Namibian culture
Lutheran denominations established in the 20th century
Lutheran World Federation members
Lutheranism in Namibia
Namibia
Christian organizations established in 1960